The Joy and Ralph Ellis Stadium is a stadium at 600 East 6th Street, Irving, Texas, United States. It is used for American football and association football (soccer) matches, and also sometimes for athletics. The stadium has a capacity of 12,500.

Up until October 28, 2016, it was named Irving Schools Stadium.

Joy and Ralph Ellis Stadium is among the largest high school football stadiums by capacity in Texas:

References

External links
 Stadium images

American football venues in the Dallas–Fort Worth metroplex
Athletics (track and field) venues in Texas
Soccer venues in Texas